Calyx shackletoni is a species of sea sponge first found on the coast of South Georgia island, in the south-western Southern Ocean.

References

External links
WORMS

Haplosclerida